Michael Long may refer to:

Government
 Michael Long (judge) (1928–1985), British judge
 Michael R. Long (1940–2022), American politician, former chairperson of the Conservative Party of New York State
 Mike Long (lobbyist), American lobbyist and political operative in Pennsylvania

Sports
 Mike Long (American football) (born 1938), American football player
 Michael E. Long (born 1946), American basketball coach and former basketball player
 Michael Long (footballer) (born 1969), Australian rules footballer
 Michael Long (golfer) (born 1968), New Zealand golfer

Others
 Michael Long (actor) (1947– 1991), Australian actor
 Michael Long (linguist) (born 1945), professor at the University of Maryland
 Mike Long (born 1974), Magic: The Gathering card game player
 Mike Long (American businessman), former CEO of Continuum, WebMD, and Homestore.com
 Mike Long (author), writes for film, government, business, and the non-profit world
 Michael G. Long, religious studies professor
 Michael Knight (Knight Rider), a fictional character whose original name was Michael Long